Patrick Joseph McAloon (born 7 June 1957) is an English singer-songwriter and a founder of the band Prefab Sprout.

Early life
McAloon was born and grew up in Witton Gilbert in County Durham, England. He was trained to be a Catholic priest before deciding on a career in music.

Career
Prefab Sprout enjoyed considerable success in the 1980s and early 1990s. They peaked commercially with "The King of Rock 'N' Roll", which was a top ten single in the UK Singles Chart.

In an interview with Rolling Stone during the Jordan: The Comeback world tour, McAloon stated he has never seen a positive royalty cheque for his work with Prefab Sprout

Songs written by McAloon have also been recorded by Kylie Minogue ("If You Don't Love Me"), Cher ("The Gunman"), Wendy Matthews ("God Watch Over You" and "Ride"), Sondre Lerche ("Nightingales" – the song appeared in "From Langley Park to Memphis" and Lerche sang it with the Faces Down Quartet as a tribute to Prefab Sprout), Danny Seward ("Home (Where The Heart Is)"), Momus ("Green Isaac Pt. 2"), and various songs for Jimmy Nail. "God Watch Over You" has also been covered by Frances Ruffelle, and "When Love Breaks Down" has been covered by The Zombies, Lisa Stansfield, and Snow Patrol. In 2008, the covers album Independents Day 08 included a version of "Bonny" performed by McAloon's label-mate Tom Smith of Editors.

McAloon released the spoken word/instrumental album I Trawl the Megahertz (UK No. 54), under his own name, in 2003 on the EMI subsidiary company Liberty Records. After losing his eyesight--now somewhat restored--he listened to CB radio and call-in talk shows and found inspiration for the album. In 2019, it was rereleased as a Prefab Sprout album.

In a 2013 interview, McAloon stated:
That record [I Trawl The Megahertz] was so important to me. I was disappointed—extremely—that the Guardian never even reviewed it. That stayed with me. I kept waiting week after week: "Come on, if you're thinking they don't make records like they used to, if you're looking for personal vision, something unusual—I'm your guy!" But it never came.

In 2006 Prefab Sprout's Steve McQueen album was remastered by Thomas Dolby, and was then released in 2007 as a double-CD package. The second CD featured acoustic versions of songs from the original album that were recorded in 2006.

On 7 September 2009, Prefab Sprout released the album Let's Change the World with Music, based on a demo recording from 1992.

A Prefab Sprout album entitled Crimson/Red was released by Icebreaker Records in October 2013. McAloon is responsible for playing all of the instruments on the album.

On 3 March 2017, McAloon, under the Prefab Sprout name, was shown singing a new song, "America", on the Instagram and YouTube channels of Keith Armstrong, his manager and the former boss of Kitchenware Records. Seeming to be a protest song about the administration of Donald Trump, and released with no accompanying publicity, the song was the subject of discussion and speculation.

Personal life
As of September 2013, McAloon resides in his native County Durham with his wife and three daughters. He suffers from a detached retina and tinnitus, which significantly limited his ability to work in the studio. McAloon dedicated Crimson/Red to "my wife and daughters", "the women with whom I'm lucky enough to share my life".

See also
Kitchenware Records
List of bands from Newcastle, United Kingdom
Newcastle upon Tyne Music
St Joseph's College, Upholland
List of singer-songwriters

References

External links
[ Paddy McAloon biography] at Allmusic website
Let There Be Music by Sean Curnyn, First Things

1957 births
Living people
English male singer-songwriters
English new wave musicians
Male new wave singers
Sophisti-pop musicians
People from Durham, England
Alumni of Northumbria University
English Roman Catholics
English male guitarists
People with Ménière's Disease